igraph is a library collection for creating and manipulating graphs and analyzing networks. It is written in C and also exists as Python and R packages. There exists moreover an interface for Mathematica. The software is widely used in academic research in network science and related fields. The publication that introduces the software has 5623 citations as of  according to Google Scholar.

igraph was originally developed by Gábor Csárdi and Tamás Nepusz. It is written in the C programming language in order to achieve good performance and it is freely available under GNU General Public License Version 2.

Basic properties

The three most important properties of igraph that shaped its development are as follows:
 igraph is capable of handling large networks efficiently
 it can be productively used with a high-level programming language
 interactive and non-interactive usage are both supported

Characteristics
The software is open source, source code can be downloaded from the project's GitHub page. There are several open source software packages that use igraph functions. As an example, R packages tnet, igraphtosonia and cccd depend on igraph R package.
Users can use igraph on many operating systems. The C library and R and Python packages need the respective software, otherwise igraph is portable. The C library of igraph is well documented as well as the R package and the Python package

Functions
igraph can be used to generate graphs, compute centrality measures and path length based properties as well as graph components and graph motifs. It also can be used for degree-preserving randomization. igraph can read and write Pajek and GraphML files, as well as simple edge lists. The library contains several layout tools as well.

References

External links
 

Free software
2006 software
Cross-platform free software
Free software programmed in C
Free software programmed in C++
Graph products